Emilia Larsson (born 13 July 1998) is a Swedish footballer midfielder who plays for Hammarby IF in the Damallsvenskan.

Honours 
Linköpings FC
Winner
 Svenska Cupen (2): 2013–14, 2014–15

Runner-up
 Svenska Supercupen: 2015

External links 
 
  (archive)
 

1998 births
Living people
Swedish women's footballers
Linköpings FC players
Damallsvenskan players
Women's association football midfielders
Sportspeople from Linköping
Footballers from Östergötland County